State Route 178 (SR 178) is a primary state highway in the U.S. state of Virginia. The state highway runs  from U.S. Route 13 Business (US 13 Business) in Exmore north to SR 620, SR 628, and SR 718 at Bobtown. SR 178 connects Exmore in far northern Northampton County with Belle Haven and Pungoteague in southern Accomack County.

Route description

SR 178 begins at an intersection with US 13 Business in the town of Exmore. The business route heads south as Main Street northeast as Lincoln Avenue. SR 178 follows two-lane undivided Main Street to US 13 (Lankford Highway), at which point the highway becomes Belle Haven Road. North of the boundary between the towns of Exmore and Belle Haven, the state highway crosses the Northampton–Accomack county line. In the center of Belle Haven, the state highway meets the western end of SR 181 (King Street); SR 178 turns west onto Shields Bridge Road, which crosses Occohannock Creek on the namesake bridge. The state highway veers north through the hamlets of Shields and Craddockville, where the highway continues northeast on Boston Road through Boston and Pennyville. SR 178's name becomes Bobtown Road at the south end of Pungoteague. Within that village, the state highway passes St. George's Church has a very short concurrency with SR 180, which heads northwest as Harborton Road and southeast as Pungoteague Road. SR 178 reaches its northern terminus at Bobtown at its intersection with SR 620 (Hollies Church Road) and SR 628 (Country Club Road). Bobtown Road continues north toward Onancock as SR 718.

Major intersections

References

External links

Virginia Highways Project: VA 178

178
State Route 178
State Route 178